The 2022 Cork Intermediate A Football Championship was the 87th staging of the Cork Intermediate A Football Championship since its establishment by the Cork County Board in 1909. The draw for the group stage placings took place on 8 February 2022. The championship ran from 21 July to 23 October 2022.

The final was played on 23 October 2022 at Páirc Uí Chaoimh in Cork, between Kilshannig and Aghabullogue, in what was their first ever meeting in the final. Kilshannig won the match by 1–16 to 0–10 to claim their second championship title overall and a first title in 34 years.

Aghabullogue' David Thompson was the championship's top scorer with 7-27.

Team changes

To Championship

Promoted from the Cork Junior A Football Championship
 Boherbue

Relegated from the Cork Premier Intermediate Football Championship
 St. Nicholas'

From Championship

Promoted to the Cork Premier Intermediate Football Championship
 Iveleary

Relegated to the South East Junior A Football Championship
 Kinsale

Group A

Group A table

Group A results

Group B

Group B table

Group B results

Group C

Group C table

Group C results

Group D

Group D table

Group D results

Knockout stage

Bracket

Quarter-finals

Semi-finals

Final

Championship Statistics

Top scorers

Overall

In a single game

References

External links
 Cork GAA website

Cork Intermediate Football Championship